Langøy or Langøyneset is a village in Averøy Municipality in Møre og Romsdal county, Norway. It is located on the northern part of the island of Averøya. It is located mainly on the small island of Langøya, off the northern coast of the main island of Averøya. The village is west of the village of Bremsnes and northeast of the village of Kårvåg. The Langøy Chapel is located here.

References

Averøy
Villages in Møre og Romsdal